Plainview is a city in and the county seat of Hale County, Texas, United States. As of the 2010 census, the population was 22,194.

Geography 

Plainview is located at  (34.191204, –101.718806) and is located on the Llano Estacado.

Climate 

According to the Köppen climate classification system, Plainview has a semiarid climate, BSk on climate maps.

Demographics

2020 census

As of the 2020 United States census, there were 20,187 people, 6,843 households, and 4,668 families residing in the city.

2000 census
As of the census of 2000, 22,336 people, 7,626 households, and 5,666 families resided in the city. The  8,471 housing units averaged . The racial makeup in the city was 63.21% White, 5.87% African American, 1.13% Native American, 0.43% Asian, 26.59% from other races, and 2.77% from two or more races. Hispanics or Latinos of any race were 49.83% of the population.

Of the 7,626 households, 40.1% had children under the age of 18 living with them, 57.2% were married couples living together, 13.0% had a female householder with no husband present, and 25.7% were not families. About 22.7% of all households were composed of single individuals, and 11.2% were households of persons 65 years of age or older living alone. The average household size was 2.82, and the average family size was four.

In the city, the population was distributed as 31.0% under the age of 18, 11.5% from 18 to 24, 26.0% from 25 to 44, 18.0% from 45 to 64, and 13.5% who were 65 years of age or older. The median age was 31 years. For every 100 females, there were 91.7 males. For every 100 females age 18 and over, there were 86.7 males.

The median income per household was $31,551, and per family was $35,215. Males had a median income of $26,434 versus $19,888 for females. The per capita income for the city was $13,791. About 15.0% of families and 19.1% of the population were below the poverty line, including 25.1% of those under age 18, and 14.8% of those aged 65 or over.

Economy 
In 2009, the Texas Department of State Health Services ordered the recall of all products produced by a processing facility near Plainview owned by Peanut Corporation of America. Rodents, excrement, and feathers in the plant had been found in the facility's products. The closure was not related to closures of PCA plants due to Salmonella concerns.

A Cargill beef processing plant, then the largest employer in the city, closed in 2013 due to lack of incoming animals, a result of the 2010–2012 drought. The closure created challenges for the city, as an estimated 2,300 employees and their families relocated.

Government 
The Texas Department of Criminal Justice Region V office is located in Plainview. The current Region V headquarters opened in 1996 in a former Bank of America building.

Education 
The city is served by the Plainview Independent School District, which enrolled 5,585 students . The district attracts transfer students from surrounding school districts. Due to the PISD's size compared to surrounding districts, many of the district's schools provide extensive support for disabled students and students with special needs not available at other schools outside the district, in addition to more specialized courses. The mascot for the Plainview High School is a grey English Bulldog nicknamed "Big Red".

Wayland Baptist University, a private, four-year, coeducational, Baptist university, is based in the city. In 1908, when the school was founded, the campus was more than a mile from the city limit. The Museum of the Llano Estacado, which opened in 1976, is located on the university grounds. The museum is home to a permanent exhibit featuring artifacts from the Plainview Site, and fossilized remains of a Columbian mammoth known as the "Imperial Mammoth".

An extension of South Plains College serves the residents of the city.

Media 

The Plainview Herald, formerly the Plainview Daily Herald, is the city's only remaining newspaper. It was acquired from local owners by Hearst Communications in 1979. It is among the oldest newspapers in Texas still in publication, and became fully computer paginated in 1994, the same year it began publishing an online edition. Customers in the city are also served by the Lubbock Avalanche-Journal, which often reports on news from Plainview.

Eight radio stations broadcast from the city, including KVOP, among the oldest in the region. KVOP's call sign originally meant "Voice of Plainview".

The city is within the Lubbock television market. Due to the terrain, television stations based in Amarillo can be received over-the-air, either directly or via repeaters north of the city. Prior to 1993, virtually all stations broadcast from Lubbock and Amarillo markets were retransmitted by the local cable operator. After changes were made to must-carry rules by the Federal Communications Commission only stations from Lubbock are available to cable and digital satellite customers in the city.

The Steve Martin film Leap of Faith (1992) was filmed in and around Plainview. Several residents were hired as extras for the film. Until 2016, a water tower east of downtown bore the name and mascot of the fictional town on which the movie was set: Rustwater Bengals.

An episode of Vice portrayed the city as a ghost town in a documentary feature called "Deliver Us from Drought", despite 22,000 residents still living in the city at the time of filming. The documentary featured numerous locations, many of which had been closed or abandoned for years prior, as examples of recent rural flight following a drought. The documentary followed the template of a similar short, "Dry and Drier in West Texas", which was broadcast on Showtime. Both documentaries portrayed residents of the city as excessively religious.

Notable people 
 James H. Clark, founder of Silicon Graphics, Netscape, and other companies
 Jimmy Dean, singer, actor, and entrepreneur, host of The Jimmy Dean Show
 Bob Dorough, bebop and cool jazz pianist
 Michael Egnew, former player for the Miami Dolphins
 Marshall Formby, a former county judge for Dickens County and a state senator
 Leonard Garcia, retired professional mixed martial artist.
 Todrick Hall, YouTube personality, singer, and Broadway actor
 Don January, professional golfer
 Jim Landtroop, former member of Texas House of Representatives
 Pete Laney, former speaker of the Texas House of Representatives
 Emily Jones McCoy, former reporter for KCBD and Fox Sports Networks
 Lawrence McCutcheon, former player for the Los Angeles Rams
 Carl Nafzger, Thoroughbred trainer of Derby winner Unbridled and 1990 Breeders' Cup
 Ray Poage, former player for the Minnesota Vikings
 Lavern Roach, professional boxer
 Mariel Salcedo, online video personality, podcast host, actress, and Producer for Rooster Teeth Productions
 Julius Waring Walker, Jr., former U.S. Ambassador to Burkina Faso
 Jamar Wall, player with Calgary Stampeders (CFL)
 James Henry Wayland, physician, founder of Wayland Baptist University

References

External links 

 
 Plainview Chamber of Commerce
 Plainview in the Handbook of Texas

Cities in Hale County, Texas
Cities in Texas
County seats in Texas
Micropolitan areas of Texas